The men's tricks competition of the Water skiing events at the 2015 Pan American Games in Toronto were held from July 20 to July 23 at the Ontario Place West Channel. The defending champion was Javier Julio of Argentina.

Results

Preliminary round

Final

References

Water skiing at the 2015 Pan American Games